This is a list of properties and districts in Mitchell County, Georgia that are listed on the National Register of Historic Places (NRHP).

Current listings

|}

References

Mitchell
Buildings and structures in Mitchell County, Georgia